Al-Riffa Sports Club is a Bahraini professional football club based in Riffa, that competes in the Bahraini Premier League, the top flight of Bahraini football. The club was founded in 1953.

History
The club was founded in 1953 under the name of West Riffa Sports Club. In 2001, the club changed the name to Al-Riffa Sports Club.

Stadium
Riffa use Bahrain National Stadium as their home ground, which has a capacity of nearly 24,000 spectators.

Achievements

The club's first international achievement was in 1982 when Riffa placed second in the GCC Club Cup. This was an important achievement for the club and Bahraini football in general as it helped the region take notice of the talent available in Bahrain.

Domestic
Bahraini Premier League: 14
 1982, 1987, 1990, 1993, 1997, 1998, 2000, 2003, 2005, 2012, 2014, 2019, 2021, 2022.

Bahraini King's Cup: 7
 1973, 1985, 1986, 1998, 2010, 2019, 2021.

Bahraini FA Cup: 4
 2000, 2001, 2004, 2014.

Bahraini Crown Prince Cup: 4
 2002, 2003, 2004, 2005.

Bahraini Super Cup: 2
 2019, 2021.

Friendly international
Scissors Cup (India): 1
1997.

Performance in AFC competitions
 AFC Champions League 1 appearance
2004: Group stage

 Asian Club Championship 5 appearances
1989: Qualifying stage
1992: Qualifying – 1st round
1995: Second round
1997: withdrew in First round
1999: First round

AFC Cup 5 appearances
2010: Semi-final
2013: Round of 16
2014: Round of 16
2015: Group stage
2022: Zonal finals

Notable managers
 Theo Laseroms (1982–84)
 Uli Maslo (1985–88), (1993–94)
 Rodion Gačanin (July 1, 2003 – June 30, 2005)
 Dragan Talajić (July 1, 2005 – June 30, 2006)
 Eelco Schattorie (2006–07)
 Srećko Juričić (July 1, 2007 – Dec 31, 2007)
 Wilco van Buuren (Youth Team Director)
 Julio Peixoto
 Stefano Impagliazzo (2011–13)
 Florin Motroc (June 1, 2013 – 2014)
 Ali Ashoor (2018 –)

References